Pennsylvania Route 349 (PA 349) is a  state highway located in Tioga County, Pennsylvania.  The southern terminus is at U.S. Route 6 (US 6) in Gaines Township.  The northern terminus is at PA 49 in Westfield.

Route description

PA 349 begins at an intersection with US 6 in Gaines Township, heading north on a two-lane undivided road. The route heads through forested areas of mountains within State Game Lands Number 208, running to the west of Long Run. Farther north, the road enters Clymer Township and passes through Davis as it turns northeast into areas of farmland and wooded mountains, heading away from Long Run and following Elklick Run. PA 349 reaches the residential community of Sabinsville and curves north again as it heads into Westfield Township. Here, the route passes through more rural areas of farms and woods with a few homes, running to the west of Mill Creek. Upon reaching the borough of Westfield, PA 349 becomes Church Street and runs past residences before ending at PA 49.

Major intersections

See also

References

External links

Pennsylvania Highways: PA 349

349
Transportation in Tioga County, Pennsylvania